Lophiotoma vezzaroi is a species of sea snail, a marine gastropod mollusk in the family Turridae, the turrids.

Description
The length of the shell attains 24 mm.

Distribution
This marine species occurs off the Philippines.

References

 Cossignani T. (2015). Lophiotoma vezzaroi sp. nov. Malacologia Mostra Mondiale. 88: 30-31

External links
 Puillandre N., Fedosov A.E., Zaharias P., Aznar-Cormano L. & Kantor Y.I. (2017). A quest for the lost types of Lophiotoma (Gastropoda: Conoidea: Turridae): integrative taxonomy in a nomenclatural mess. Zoological Journal of the Linnean Society. 181: 243-271
 Gastropods.com: Lophiotoma vezzaroi

vezzaroi
Gastropods described in 2015